Ratiopharm Ulm, officially stylized as ratiopharm Ulm, is a professional basketball club based in Ulm, Germany. The club has two teams, one professional team, which plays in the Basketball Bundesliga, the major German professional league and one youth team, which plays in the NBBL (Nachwuchs Basketball-Bundesliga). The home arena of the team is the Ratiopharm Arena, an indoor sporting arena with a capacity of approximately 6,000 spectators.

The mascot of the team is a rabbit named Spass ("fun"), who somewhat resembles Bugs Bunny. The main sponsor of the team is the pharmaceutical company Ratiopharm. The team colors are orange, white, and black.

History

Early years (2001–2006)
The club was founded in 2001 after the previous professional basketball team in Ulm, run by the sports-club SSV Ulm 1846, became insolvent and had to resign from the league. Dr. Thomas Stoll and Andreas Oettel, the current CEO of the Basketball Ulm/Alb-Donau GmbH, which is the owner of the club, bought the license of the former team and started a second division team with the name of Basketball Ulm GmbH. After playing in the second division for five years, the team qualified for the Basketball Bundesliga in 2006.

First Bundesliga seasons (2006–2011)

In the 2006–07 season, led by Head coach Mike Taylor and Assistant coach Rainer Bauer the team headed into their first season in the Basketball Bundesliga as the team with the smallest funds and the smallest arena in the league. With just two new players for the starting five, the team was seen by the media and many experts as the team most likely to be relegated to the second division again after the season. But due to a well-rehearsed team, with only a few players changed in the off-season, the team had some big upset wins and remained in the league with a 16–18 record. At the end of the season point guard Austen Rowland had the league's best assists per game rate and power forward Jeff Gibbs became the best rebounder in the league and was nominated as a starting-five player for the All-Star game.

Still a club with one of the smallest funds in the league, the team experienced some major changes in the pre-season of their second year in the Bundesliga because starting point guard Austen Rowland and shooting guard Jonathan Levy left the team while starting small forward Emeka Erege received a serious injury during an exhibition game. Nevertheless, the team was ranked twelfth in the league after 16 of 34 games with a 9–6 record.

In the 2008–09 season, with a young and talented team, ratiopharm Ulm had a very successful season. At the end of the 2008–09 season ulm was ranked on position five and entered the playoffs with a 21–13 record. But in the playoff the team was eliminated early, throughout a 3–0 loss against Telekom Baskets Bonn.

After a very good season in 2008–09, Ulm lost the league's best rebounder and most efficient player Jeff Gibbs to Eisbären Bremerhaven. The 2009–10 season ended on rank thirteen, which means Ulm was far away from the playoffs and away from a relegation spot, too. In the 2010–11 season, Ulm ended on the 14th place.

Climbing the ranks (2011–present)

In the 2011–12 season Ulm reached the Basketball Bundesliga Finals, after finishing second in the regular season. In the Playoffs Ulm had beaten Phantoms Braunschweig and S.Oliver Baskets and had a Playoff record of 6–0 coming into the Finals. In the Finals Ulm, lost 0–3 to Brose Baskets.

In the 2012–13 season Ulm entered a European competition for the first time, in the 2012–13 Eurocup, the team reached the quarterfinals. Ulm reached the BBL semi-finals and lost in the German Cup Final, 67–85 against Alba Berlin, as well that season.

In the 2016–17 season, the club had a historically successful season as the team started the Basketball Bundesliga with 27 consecutive wins. The club ended in the first place of the regular season with 30 wins and just 2 losses, but could not achieve the title as it lost in the semi-finals of the playoffs by EWE Baskets Oldenburg.

In June 2019, Jaka Lakovič signed a three-year contract as head coach of Ulm. His appointment meant the end of the Thorsten Leibenath era, who coached the club for eight seasons. Leibenath stepped down as head coach and started working as sporting director of the club.

Players

Current roster

Depth chart

Season by season

Honors and awards
Basketball Bundesliga
Runners-up (3): 1997–98, 2011–12, 2015–16

BBL-Pokal
Winners: 1996
Runners-up (4): 1994, 1995, 2013, 2014

BBL Champions Cup
Runners-up: 2012

ProA (II)
Champions: 2005–06

 Stechert Cup
Winners: 2011

Team

Award winners

Notable players

Head coaches

References

External links
 
Eurobasket.com Team Profile
Basketball Bundesliga Team Profile 

 
Basketball teams established in 2001
2001 establishments in Germany
Ulm
Basketball clubs in Baden-Württemberg
Basketball teams in Germany
Sport in Tübingen (region)